The 1973 European Amateur Boxing Championships  were held in Belgrade, Yugoslavia from 1 to 9 June. The 20th edition of the bi-annual competition was organised by the European governing body for amateur boxing, EABA. There were 148 fighters from 22 countries participating.

Medal winners

Medal table

External links
Results
Amateur Boxing

European Amateur Boxing Championships
Boxing
European Amateur Boxing Championships
Boxing
International sports competitions in Belgrade
June 1973 sports events in Europe
1973 in Serbia
1970s in Belgrade